Sri Lanka (formerly called Ceylon) has a climate and varied elevation that allows for the production of both Camellia sinensis var. assamica and Camellia sinensis var. sinensis, with the assamica varietal holding the majority of production. Tea production is one of the main sources of foreign exchange for Sri Lanka, and accounts for 2% of GDP, contributing over US$1.3 billion in 2021 to the economy of Sri Lanka. It employs, directly or indirectly, over 1 million people, and in 1995 directly employed 215,338 on tea plantations and estates. In addition, tea planting by smallholders is the source of employment for thousands whilst it is also the main form of livelihood for tens of thousands of families. Sri Lanka is the world's fourth-largest producer of tea. In 1995, it was the world's leading exporter of tea (rather than producer), with 23% of the total world export, and Sri Lanka ranked second on tea export earnings in 2020 after China. The highest production of 340 million kg was recorded in 2013, while the production in 2014 was slightly reduced to 338 million kg.

The humidity, cool temperatures, and rainfall of the country's central highlands provide a climate that favors the production of high-quality tea. On the other hand, tea produced in low-elevation areas such as Matara, Galle, and Ratanapura districts with high rainfall and warm temperature has a high level of astringent properties. The tea biomass production itself is higher in low-elevation areas. Such tea is popular in the Middle East. Sri Lanka produces mostly orthodox black teas but also produces CTC, white and green teas. The two types of green tea produced are the gunpowder type and sencha. The industry was introduced to the country in 1867 by James Taylor, a British planter who arrived in 1852.
Tea planting under smallholder conditions has become popular in the 1970s. Most of Sri Lanka's export market is in the Middle East and Europe but there are also plenty of bidders worldwide for its specialty high-country-grown Nuwara Eliya teas.

History

The total population of Sri Lanka according to the census of 1871 was 2,584,780. The 1871 demographic distribution and population in the plantation areas are given below:

Growth and history of commercial production

Registered tea production by elevation
Registered tea production in hectares and total square miles by elevation category in Sri Lanka, 1959–2000:

Main destination of Sri Lankan teas
The most important foreign markets for Sri Lankan tea are the former Soviet bloc countries of the CIS, the United Arab Emirates, Russia, Syria, Turkey, Iran, Saudi Arabia, Iraq, UK, Egypt, Libya and Japan.

The most important foreign markets for Sri Lankan tea are as follows, in terms of millions of kilograms and millions of pounds imported. The figures were recorded in 2000:

Revenue Statistics

Branding

The Sri Lanka Tea Board is the legal proprietor of the lion logo of Ceylon tea. The logo has been registered as a trademark in many countries. To appear the Lion logo on a tea pack, it must meet four criteria.
 The Lion Logo can only be used on consumer packs of Ceylon tea.
 The packs must contain 100 percent of pure Ceylon tea.
 The packaging should be done only in Sri Lanka.
 The brands which employ the Lion logo should meet the quality standards set by the Sri Lanka Tea Board.

The logo is considered to be a "known sign of high quality" around the world. The Sri Lanka Tea board signed an agreement to sponsor Sri Lanka national cricket team and Sri Lanka women's national cricket team in their overseas tours for US$4 million for three years.

Research

The Tea Research Institute
The Tea Research Ordinance was enacted by Parliament in 1925 and the Tea Research Institute (TRI) was founded. It is at present the only national body in the country that generates and disseminates new research and technology related to the processing and cultivation of tea.

Beginning in the early 1970s, two researchers from the National Institute of Dental Research in Bethesda, Maryland, USA conducted a series of research projects in which they arranged a longitudinal study group of a large number of Tamil tea labourers who worked at the Dunsinane and Harrow Tea Estates,  from Kandy.  This landmark study was possible because the population of tea labourers were known to have never employed any conventional oral hygiene measures, thereby providing some insight into the natural history of periodontal disease in man.

Sustainability standards and certifications

There are several organisations, both international and local, that promote and enforce sustainability standards and certifications about tea in Sri Lanka.

Among the international organisations that operate within Sri Lanka are Rainforest Alliance, Fairtrade, UTZ Certified, and Ethical Tea Partnership. 
The Small Organic Farmers’ Association  (SOFA) is a local organisation dedicated to organic farming.

Gallery

See also
Akbar Tea
Dilmah
George Steuart Group (Steuarts Tea, 1835 Steuarts Ceylon)
Heladiv
Island Tea
Loolecondera
Mlesna
Thomas Lipton
Tea production in Azerbaijan
Tea production in Bangladesh
Tea production in Indonesia
Tea production in Nepal
Tea production in Kenya
Tea production in Uganda
Tea production in the United States

References

Further reading

External links

 , Official website of the Sri Lanka Tea Board
 Taylor, Lipton and the Birth of Ceylon Tea

Agriculture in Sri Lanka
Economy of Sri Lanka
Sri Lanka
Tea industry in Sri Lanka